"Senza una donna" is a song written and performed by Italian singer and musician Zucchero on his fourth album, Blue's (1987). Originally recorded in Italian, in 1990 it was re-recorded in English with English singer and musician Paul Young. The English lyrics were contributed by Frank Musker. The song was then released as a single under the title "Senza una donna (Without a Woman)".

The English version of the song reached number four on the UK Singles Chart and number two on both the German Singles Chart and the French Singles Chart. It also topped the charts of Belgium, Ireland, Norway, Quebec, and Sweden, selling more than 5,000,000 copies worldwide. It was also one of the most famous songs in Venezuela in 1991. "Senza una donna" was released along with two music videos: one for the solo version and another for the duet version.

Critical reception
Larry Flick from Billboard commented, "Italo pop star has outsold Madonna and Michael Jackson in his homeland. On this duet with Young, Zucchero makes his U.S. debut with a smooth and rhythmic ballad that will likely find its initial audience at AC radio, though tune is charming enough to cross into mainstream pop territory." A reviewer from Liverpool Echo described the song as "stylish", noting the "marvellously atmospheric setting" of the music video, "which was actually filmed in a church hall in Chiswick."

Track listings
 7-inch single
 "Senza una donna (Without a Woman)"
 "Madre dolcissima" by Zucchero

 CD single
 "Senza una donna (Without a Woman)" (7 inch) — 4:26
 "Dunes of Mercy" by Zucchero — 5:38

 CD maxi
 "Senza una donna (Without a Woman)"
 "Madre dolcissima" by Zucchero
 "Dunes of Mercy" by Zucchero

Charts

Weekly charts

Year-end charts

Decade-end charts

Certifications

References

1987 songs
1991 singles
Number-one singles in Belgium
European Hot 100 Singles number-one singles
Number-one singles in Norway
Number-one singles in Sweden
Paul Young songs
Male vocal duets
Zucchero Fornaciari songs
Songs written by Zucchero Fornaciari
Pop ballads
Songs written by Frank Musker